Waldemar Jan Sługocki, ; born September 9, 1971 in [Sulechów]. President of the Civic Platform in the Lubusz Voivodeship since 2017. In the 2019 Polish parliamentary election he was re-elected deputy to the Sejm, running for the Civic Platform and receiving 29,580 votes

References

External links
 The Senate
 Official website
 Civic Platform, Lubusz Voivodeship

1971 births
Living people
Polish government officials
Polish politicians
Polish political scientists